Groypers, sometimes called the Groyper Army, are a group of white nationalist and far-right activists, provocateurs and internet trolls who are notable for their attempts to introduce far-right politics into mainstream conservatism in the United States, their participation in the 2021 United States Capitol attack and the protests leading up to it, and their extremist views. They are known for targeting other conservative groups and individuals whose agendas they view as too moderate and insufficiently nationalist. The Groyper movement has been described as white nationalist, homophobic, nativist, fascist, sexist, antisemitic, and an attempt to rebrand the declining alt-right movement.

Groypers are a loosely defined group of followers and fans of Nick Fuentes, a white nationalist, far-right political commentator and livestreamer. After Fuentes, there is no clear second in the Groyper hierarchy. Groypers are named after a cartoon amphibian named "Groyper", which is a variant of the Internet meme Pepe the Frog.

Michelle Malkin, a conservative blogger and political commentator, has referred to herself as the "mommy" of the Groyper movement, though she plays a minor role in the cause.

In February 2021, the Groyper movement splintered between Nick Fuentes and Patrick Casey over fears of infiltration by federal informants and doxing at the 2021 America First Political Action Conference, held by Fuentes. Jaden McNeil of America First Students joined in support of Fuentes' conference and accused Casey of disloyalty to Fuentes. In May 2022, McNeil distanced himself from Fuentes in an "interpersonal clash of egos" following conflict over his former position as treasurer of Fuentes' America First Foundation.

Ideology 
Groypers are extremely conservative and critical of more mainstream conservative organizations, which they believe to be insufficiently nationalist and pro-white; thus, appealing to racist and xenophobic individuals. Groypers and their leaders have tried to position the group's ideology as being based around "Christian conservatism", "traditional values", and "American nationalism". Some Groypers downplay the extremism of their positions, and instruct others on how to engage in entryism and radicalization tactics such as slowly introducing their targets to increasingly extreme ideas. Despite attempts to brand themselves more moderately, the group is widely recognized as white nationalist, antisemitic, and homophobic.

Fuentes claimed that he had been "oppressed" by "the Jews" and blamed antisemitic actions as being the Jewish community's own fault, claiming that matters "tend to go from zero to sixty" and that "the reason is them". Fuentes declared that matters would get "a lot uglier" for their community if they did not begin to support "people like us". According to the Anti-Defamation League, Groypers blame the mainstream conservative movement as well as the political left for what they view as "destroying white America". They oppose immigration and globalism. Groypers support "traditional" values and Christianity and oppose feminism and LGBTQ rights.

Describing the relationship between Groypers and the Republican Party, Nick Fuentes has stated, "We are the right-wing flank of the Republican Party." He summarized his political ambitions by stating, "We have got to be on the right, dragging [moderate Republicans] kicking and screaming into the future. Into a truly reactionary party." In 2022, Fuentes advocated for a political "white uprising" to bring Donald Trump back to power and "never leave," wanting America to "stop having elections" and abolish the United States Congress.

Background 
Groypers are named after a cartoon amphibian named "Groyper", which is a variant of the Internet meme Pepe the Frog. Groyper is depicted as a rotund, green, frog-like creature, often in a sitting position with its chin resting on interlocked fingers. There is some disagreement around the specifics of Groyper: it is alternatively said to be a depiction of the Pepe character, a different character from Pepe but of the same species, or a toad. The Groyper meme was used as early as 2015, and became popular in 2017.

In 2018, a group of computer scientists studying hateful speech on Twitter observed the Groyper image being used frequently in account avatars among the accounts identified as "hateful" in their dataset. The researchers observed that the profiles tended to be anonymous and collectively tweeted primarily about politics, race, and religion. Similarly, they detected that the users were not "lone wolves" and the individuals could be identified as a community with a high network centrality. The same year, Right Wing Watch reported that Massachusetts congressional hopeful Shiva Ayyadurai had created a campaign pin featuring a variation of the Groyper image, which RWW described as an attempt to appeal to the far-right activists on 4chan, Gab, and Twitter who had adopted the meme.

Followers of Nick Fuentes began to be known as Groypers beginning in 2019. Fuentes' followers are also sometimes called "Nickers". In September 2019, Ashley St. Clair, a "brand ambassador" for the conservative student group Turning Point USA, was photographed at an event featuring several allegedly white nationalist and alt-right figures, including Fuentes, Jacob Wohl, and Anthime Gionet, better known as "Baked Alaska". After Right Wing Watch brought the photographs to Turning Point USA's attention, the organization issued a statement declaring that it had severed ties with St. Clair, and condemning white nationalism as "abhorrent and un-American". At the 2019 Politicon convention, Fuentes tried to access several of the Turning Point USA events featuring its founder Charlie Kirk, including a line to take photos with Kirk and Kirk's debate with Kyle Kulinski of The Young Turks. Security repeatedly barred him from being allowed anywhere near Kirk, with Fuentes accusing Kirk of deliberately suppressing him in order to avoid a confrontation, as Fuentes had grown critical of Kirk's positions, which he believes are too weak.

Groyper Wars 
In the fall of 2019, Kirk launched a college speaking tour with Turning Point USA titled "Culture War", featuring himself alongside such guests as Senator Rand Paul, Donald Trump Jr., Kimberly Guilfoyle, Lara Trump, and Congressman Dan Crenshaw. In retaliation for the firing of St. Clair and the Politicon incident, Fuentes subsequently began organizing a social media campaign asking his followers to go to Kirk's events and ask provocative and controversial leading questions regarding his stances on immigration, Israel, and LGBT rights during the question-and-answer sessions, for the purpose of exposing Kirk as a "fake conservative". At a Culture War event hosted by Ohio State University on October 29, eleven out of fourteen questions during the Q&A section were asked by Groypers. Groypers asked questions including, "Can you prove that our white European ideals will be maintained if the country is no longer made up of white European descendants?", and directed the question "How does anal sex help us win the culture war?" at Kirk's co-host Rob Smith, a gay black veteran of the Iraq War. Fuentes' social media campaign against Kirk became known as the "Groyper Wars". Kirk, Smith, and others at Turning Point USA, including Benny Johnson, began labeling the questioners as white supremacists and anti-Semites.

Another Turning Point USA event targeted by the Groypers was a promotional event for Donald Trump Jr.'s book Triggered, featuring Trump, Kirk, and Guilfoyle at the University of California, Los Angeles in November 2019. Anticipating further questions from Fuentes' followers, it was announced that the originally planned Q&A portion of the event would be canceled, which led to heckling and boos from the mostly pro-Trump audience. The disruptions eventually forced them to cut the event short after 30 minutes, when it was originally scheduled to last for two hours.

Groypers' targets for heckling quickly expanded beyond Charlie Kirk and Turning Point USA. Groypers began targeting other mainstream conservative groups and individuals, which they sometimes collectively call "Conservative Inc.", including events hosted by Young America's Foundation and their student outreach branch Young Americans for Freedom, which included such speakers as Ben Shapiro and Matt Walsh of The Daily Wire, and Jonah Goldberg of The Dispatch. Questions posed to their opponents often focus on topics including United States–Israel relations, immigration policy, affirmative action, and LGBTQ conservatives. They regularly use anti-Semitic dogwhistles in their confrontations with other conservatives, including numerous questions about the USS Liberty incident, and references to the "dancing Israelis" conspiracy theory alleging Israeli involvement in the September 11 attacks.

Other activities 
In December 2019, Fuentes announced and held the Groyper Leadership Summit in Florida. A small group attended the event in person, and attendees also joined via livestream. The event was held at the same time and in the same city as Turning Point USA's Student Action Summit (SAS); Groypers argued with SAS attendees outside of their venue, and Fuentes, Patrick Casey, and some Groypers were removed from the SAS venue after attempting to enter. At the Groyper Leadership Summit, Fuentes, Casey, and former InfoWars contributor Jake Lloyd spoke about the Groypers' strategy and ideology. While outside of a venue where a Turning Point USA event was being held, Fuentes crossed paths with Ben Shapiro, who was on his way to the event with his pregnant wife and two children. Fuentes confronted Shapiro over his past public speaking comments, while Shapiro refused to acknowledge him. Fuentes faced widespread condemnation from politicians and various pundits—including Nikki Haley, Meghan McCain, Sebastian Gorka, Megyn Kelly, and Michael Avenatti—for confronting Shapiro while he was with his family.

In January 2020, Groyper and former leader of Kansas State University's Turning Point USA chapter Jaden McNeil formed the Kansas State University organization America First Students. The group, which shares a name with Fuentes' America First podcast, was conceived at the Groyper Leadership Summit, and Groyper leaders have helped promote the group. The America First Students organization, which states it was formed "in defense of Christian values, strong families, closed borders, and the American worker", is considered to push the Groyper movement.

In February 2020, Fuentes spoke at several events that were held as rival events to the Conservative Political Action Conference. One such event, hosted by the online publication National File, featured Fuentes, Alex Jones of InfoWars, and Proud Boys founder Gavin McInnes. Fuentes hosted the first annual America First Political Action Conference, which included such speakers as Patrick Casey, former Daily Caller author Scott Greer, and Malkin.

Groypers are very active online, particularly on Twitter, and have engaged in targeted harassment against opponents. Financial Times reported that many Groypers use "deceptively anodyne" Twitter biographies, describing themselves in terms that downplay their extremism, like "Christian conservative". In April 2020, The Daily Dot reported that Fuentes and other Groypers had begun to move to the video sharing platform TikTok, where they streamed live and used the "duet" feature to respond to Trump supporters. Groypers particularly targeted one left-wing teenage girl for harassment, which began on TikTok but spread across platforms. Fuentes and some other Groyper accounts were banned from TikTok shortly after the Daily Dot article was published.

Reactions 
The Groyper Wars earned widespread media attention after the UCLA incident with Donald Trump Jr. Chadwick Moore of Spectator USA commented that the ordeal revealed deep divisions within the American right among young voters, particularly with regards to the political beliefs of Generation Z, or "Zoomers". This divide, Moore claims, is due to the Groypers viewing Charlie Kirk and others in the mainstream conservative movement as "snatching the baton and appointing themselves the guardians of 2016's spoils", despite holding beliefs that Fuentes and his followers believe to be in conflict with then-President Trump's "Make America Great Again" agenda. Another Spectator author, Ben Sixsmith, claimed that Turning Point's unwillingness to respond to controversial questions, and subsequent use of insults to dismiss their critics, revealed the organization's hypocrisy after having "promoted themselves as the debate guys".

Several mainstream conservative commentators also weighed in on the matter. Addressing the increase in attention towards the far-right due to the aggressive questioning of Kirk, Ben Shapiro gave a speech at Stanford University in which he attacked Fuentes (without naming him) and his followers as essentially being a rebranded version of the alt-right. Representative Dan Crenshaw similarly referred to the questioners as "alt-right 2.0" while American Conservative Union chairman Matt Schlapp said that "there is no place in our conservative movement for those interested in fomenting hate, mob violence, or racist propaganda." Conversely, conservative commentator Michelle Malkin wrote an article for American Greatness attacking Kirk for his immigration policies, and particularly his stance that green cards should be awarded to immigrants who graduate from American universities. After defending Fuentes and his followers, Malkin was fired as a speaker for Young America's Foundation, a rival organization to Turning Point whose events had also been targeted by Groypers. Malkin later would refer to herself as a mother figure among and a leader of the Groypers.

References

Further reading 
 

2010s neologisms
Alt-right organizations
American conspiracy theorists
American nationalism
Anti-immigration politics in the United States
Anti-black racism in the United States
Anti-globalization movement
Anti-LGBT sentiment
Antisemitism in the United States
Anti-Zionism in the United States
Criticism of feminism
Criticism of neoconservatism
Internet trolls
Organizations that oppose LGBT rights in the United States
White supremacist groups in the United States